Harald Stenerud (10 May 1897 – 5 February 1976) was a Norwegian hammer and discus thrower. He represented TIF Viking in Bergen.  
 
He became Norwegian champion in discus throw in 1928 and 1931, and in hammer throw in the years 1928–1931 and 1933–1935.

References

1897 births
1976 deaths
Norwegian male discus throwers
Norwegian male hammer throwers
Athletes (track and field) at the 1928 Summer Olympics
Olympic athletes of Norway
Sportspeople from Bergen